Nadja Käther (born 29 September 1988) is a German athlete who specialises in the long jump. She competed at the 2010 European Championships and 2016 European Championships.

Personal bests

Outdoor

Indoor

References

External links 

 

1988 births
Living people
German female long jumpers
Athletes from Hamburg